Edith Mary England (1 July 1899 – 1979/1981) was an Australian novelist and poet who was born in Townsville, Queensland.

Biography

England was born in Townsville, Queensland to John England and Jane Kelly England. She moved to Boonah in south-east Queensland at the age of six, and was later educated in Sydney and at Ipswich Grammar. She received a degree in music and taught for a while.  In 1922, England married Schomberg Montagu Bertie, and had two daughters, Caroline (1923) and Patricia (1926). Bertie died in 1937, and in 1938 England left Boonah. She was remarried in 1942 to Harry August Anders.

E. M. England died in 1979 or 1981.

Writing career
Her first published poems appeared in the Australian Town and Country Journal in 1915 and her first poetry collection was published in 1927. She published eight novels during her lifetime with the first appearing as a serial in The Queenslander in 1928–29.

Bibliography

Novels 
 Laughing Devlin (1929)
 Hermit's Hill (1930)
 The Sealed Temple (1933)
 Strange Sequence (1948)
 House of Bondage (1950)
 Where the Turtles Dance (1950)
 Ganaralean (1950)
 Road Going North (1952)

Short story collection 
 Tornado and Other Stories (1945)

Poetry collections 
 The Happy Monarch and Other Verses (1927)
 Queensland Days : Poems (1944)
 Where the Old Road Ran; and Other Poems (1970)

Edited 
 Lost Kinship and Other Poems : A Memorial to Llewelyn Lucas (1968)

References

1899 births
20th-century deaths
20th-century Australian poets
Australian women poets
Date of death missing
Year of death uncertain
20th-century Australian women writers